Kevon Carter (14 November 1983 – 28 February 2014) was an international soccer player from Trinidad and Tobago who played professionally for Defence Force as a forward.

Carter died of a heart attack after feeling chest pains during a training session in the morning of 28 February 2014.

International career 

He made his Trinidad and Tobago senior début in March 2004 against Guyana, and in April 2008 he scored his first international goal versus Grenada.

International goals

Source:

References 

1983 births
2014 deaths
Trinidad and Tobago footballers
Trinidad and Tobago international footballers
TT Pro League players
Defence Force F.C. players
2013 CONCACAF Gold Cup players
Association football forwards
Sport deaths in North America